The 2006 WNBA season was the tenth for the New York Liberty. The team finished the season with the worst record in franchise history, at 11-23.

Offseason
In the 2006 WNBA Expansion Draft, the Chicago Sky selected DeTrina White from the New York Liberty.

WNBA Draft

Regular season

Season standings

Season schedule

Player stats

References

External links
Liberty on Basketball Reference

New York Liberty seasons
New York
New York Liberty